Kobsak Sabhavasu (born 28 March 1949) is a Thai politician and former Deputy Prime Minister.

Education 
Saint Gabriel's College
California Polytechnic State University
Stanford University

Political careers

In 2009, Kobsak and Korn Chatikavanij spoke in support of an economic stimulus plan proposed by Prime Minister Abhisit Vejjajiva. During the speech, Kobsak said that country's unemployment rate could be expected to remain at 2-2.5% until 2010.

In 2014, Kobsak urged the country's Anti Money Laundering Office to focus on bringing criminal suspects to justice rather than on investigating perceived enemies of Prime Minister Thaksin Shinawatra.

Honours

Royal decorations
Kobsak has received the following royal decorations in the Honours System of Thailand:
  1999 Knight Grand Cordon (Special Class) of the Most Exalted Order of the White Elephant
  1998 Knight Grand Cordon (Special Class) of the Most Noble Order of the Crown of Thailand

References

Living people
Kobsak Sabhavasu
Place of birth missing (living people)
1949 births
Kobsak Sabhavasu